Kristian Kristensen (born 9 June 1974) is a Danish team handball coach, who coach Ribe-Esbjerg HH since 2020.

He previously coached Danish women's youth national team, Roskilde Håndbold and Herning-Ikast Håndbold.

Kristensen were also a part of the Hungarian women's national team, as Analyzer/Physical coach, from 2017 to 2019.

References

Living people
Danish male handball players
1974 births
Danish handball coaches